Alfonso Grosso Sánchez (September 1, 1893 in Seville – December 12, 1983 in Seville) was a Spanish painter.

Biography 
Sánchez trained at the Royal Academy of Fine Arts of Saint Isabel of Hungary in Seville, being a disciple of José García Ramos and Gonzalo Bilbao.

In 1940, he was appointed professor at the Royal Academy of Fine Arts in Seville, where he became professor of color and composition. He was also director of the Museum of Fine Arts of Seville.

References 

1893 births
1983 deaths
People from Seville
Spanish painters